Tamashima may refer to:
 a minor planet of the solar system, see: List of minor planets
 the Japanese town of Tamashima, merged into the town of Kurashiki in 1967